Dichomeris gnophrina is a moth in the family Gelechiidae. It was described by Cajetan Felder, Rudolf Felder and Alois Friedrich Rogenhofer in 1875. It is found on the Moluccas.

References

Moths described in 1875
gnophrina